Cheran or Charan in Iran may refer to:
Cheran, East Azerbaijan
Charan, Gilan
Cheran, Razavi Khorasan

See also
Charan (disambiguation)